The 1995 Star World Championships were held in Laredo, Spain between September 10 and 16, 1995.

Results

References

Star World Championships
1995 in sailing
Sailing competitions in Spain